Víctor Barrio Hernanz (29 May 1987 – 9 July 2016) was a Spanish 
bullfighter from Segovia. He was killed by a bull during the Feria del Ángel festival in Teruel; the bullfight was broadcast live on television. He was the first bullfighter to be killed in Spain since José "Yiyo" Cubero Sanchez in 1985 (excluding the banderilleros Manolo Montoliú and Ramón Soto Vargas, who died in 1992).

Barrio was killed by a 529-kg bull named Lorenzo. The bull's horns perforated Barrio's chest several times. He was transported to the bullring's infirmary and was pronounced dead shortly thereafter. The autopsy revealed that Barrio's lungs and thoracic aorta had been pierced. Spanish Prime Minister Mariano Rajoy paid tribute to him. Due to Barrio's death, most of the festival acts were cancelled. 

Lorenzo died of injuries sustained during the fight, and there was widespread speculation that Lorenzo's mother, Lorenza, would be killed as part of the practice of "killing off the bloodline" where the families of "murderer bulls" would be killed. This was rendered moot as it was later confirmed by Lorenza's ranchers that she had died before the event from old age.

See also 

 Bullfighting in Spain

References

1987 births
2016 deaths
Bullfighters killed in the arena
Filmed deaths in sports
People from Segovia
Sportspeople from the Province of Segovia
Spanish bullfighters
Sport deaths in Spain